Anne Frances Twomey  is an Australian academic and lawyer specialising in Australian constitutional law. She is currently the Professor of Constitutional Law and Director of the Constitutional Reform Unit at Sydney Law School at the University of Sydney. She is a regular commentator on legal and constitutional issues for the Australian media.

Education and academic career
Twomey holds degrees in Arts and Law from the University of Melbourne, a Master of Laws from the Australian National University, and a Doctor of Philosophy from the University of New South Wales.

Twomey has worked for the High Court of Australia as a Senior Research Officer, for the Parliament of Australia as a researcher in the Law and Government Group, and The Cabinet Office of New South Wales as Policy Manager of the Legal Branch. She has acted as a consultant to a number of government bodies.

Twomey is regarded as an expert on the Constitution of Australia.

In 2019, Twomey was appointed to a New South Wales Government panel to examine the financial relationship between the state and federal governments.

Books

Honours and personal life
Twomey was appointed an Officer of the Order of Australia in the 2021 Queen's Birthday Honours, for "distinguished service to the law, to legal education, and to public education on constitutional matters".

Twomey is married to Justice Mark Leeming, a judge on the New South Wales Court of Appeal.

References

21st-century Australian lawyers
Australian women lawyers
Australian legal scholars
Australian National University alumni
Living people
Officers of the Order of Australia
University of Melbourne alumni
University of New South Wales alumni
Academic staff of the University of Sydney
Year of birth unknown
Scholars of constitutional law
Year of birth missing (living people)